William Potts (May 1883 – 1947), a Detroit police officer, is credited with inventing the modern, three-lens traffic light in Detroit in 1920. (The two-lens, red/green traffic signal was invented in London in 1868 by John Peake Knight).

Biography
William Potts was born in Bad Axe, Michigan. The 1900 census lists Potts as 17 years old and a police officer. By 1910, he was married to Grace (Baker) Potts, and they subsequently had 4 children. Potts became the 'superintendent, signal person police' for the city of Detroit.

The old system of police directing traffic had become increasing outmoded; two-color signals, with green and red lights, already existed, but they did not leave drivers sufficient time to stop at high speeds. Some municipalities experimented with leaving the green on for a few seconds after the red was illuminated, to caution the driver that the right of way was soon to change. In 1917, Potts devised a new system by inventing a 'yellow' or 'amber' light which would shine after the green light and before the red light to indicate the impending transition.

In 1920, Potts designed the first four-way, three-color traffic signal tower, which was installed at the intersection of Woodward and Michigan Avenues in Detroit in October 1920.

See also
 Traffic light
 Traffic-light signalling and operation

References

Humorously referenced in "The Magicians" season 5 episode 5.

External links
 http://didyouknow.org/trafficlights/
 http://signalfan.freeservers.com/historical/pottssig1.htm

1883 births
1947 deaths
Detroit Police Department officers
Traffic signals
People from Bad Axe, Michigan
20th-century American inventors